Linda Thwala (born ) is a South African rugby union player that made 14 appearances for the  in 2016 and 2017, including two in the 2016 Currie Cup Premier Division. His regular position is prop.

References

1994 births
Living people
Boland Cavaliers players
Rugby union players from Durban
Rugby union props
South African rugby union players